A vehicle registration certificate is an official 
document providing proof of registration of a vehicle.  It is used primarily by governments as a means of ensuring that all road vehicles are on the national vehicle register, but is also used as a form of law enforcement and to facilitate change of ownership when buying and selling a vehicle.

European Union and European Economic Area
In the European Economic Area (EU, Iceland, Liechtenstein and Norway), vehicle registration certificates are governed by the European directive 1999/37/EC. The information contained in these registration certificates includes:
 Vehicle registration number
 Personal data of the individual to whom the vehicle is registered
 Vehicle identification number (VIN)
 Engine specifications
 Exhaust emissions

United Kingdom
In the UK the document (V5C) was previously referred to as the "log book", and this name is still common usage. The document is issued by the DVLA and tracks the registered keeper of the vehicle, rather than the owner. When a vehicle is transferred, exported, scrapped or had major modification (new engine, chassis or factors affecting the taxation class) the form is returned to the DVLA, who issue a new document, if appropriate, with the amended details.

2001 redesign 
A new design was issued in 2001 to comply with EC directive 2001/127/EC? (or 2003/127/EC), not as a result of a theft of blank forms in the same year.

Red forms 
In 2011 and 2012, a programme was launched to replace the previous blue forms with new red forms as a result of "theft of a number of blank V5Cs".  The theft may have been of several hundred thousand forms in 2007 and 2008, or the loss of over two million forms reported in 2008. Both or either incidents may relate to blank forms returned to a supplier in 2006 for overprinting which were eventually sent to be destroyed.

The police (NVCIS) launched "Operation Drift" to recover stolen forms, over a thousand being recovered. The relevant serial numbers of the illegal V5Cs are either (according to the police):
 BG 8407501 – BG 8431000
 BG 9167501 – BG 9214000
 BG 9282001 – BG 9305000
 BI 2305501 – BI 2800000

or, according to the DVLA reported in Parker's:
 BG 8229501 - BG 9999030
 BI 2305501 - BI 2800000

See also
Vehicle title (or Pink slip)
Electric vehicle conversion
Vehicle registration

References

External links
 Driver and Vehicle Licensing Agency (DVLA) in the UK

Vehicle law